Henry Hobson Richardson, FAIA (September 29, 1838 – April 27, 1886) was an American architect, best known for his work in a style that became known as Richardsonian Romanesque. Along with Louis Sullivan and Frank Lloyd Wright, Richardson is one of "the recognized trinity of American architecture".

Biography

Early life
Richardson was born at the Priestley Plantation in St. James Parish, Louisiana, and spent part of his childhood in New Orleans, where his family lived on Julia Row in a red brick house designed by the architect Alexander T. Wood. He was the great-grandson of inventor and philosopher Joseph Priestley, who is usually credited with the discovery of oxygen.

Richardson went on to study at Harvard College and Tulane University. Initially, he was interested in civil engineering, but shifted to architecture, which led him to go to Paris in 1860 to attend the famed École des Beaux Arts in the atelier of Louis-Jules André. He was only the second U.S. citizen to attend the École's architectural division—Richard Morris Hunt was the first—and the school was to play an increasingly important role in training Americans in the following decades.

He did not finish his training there, as family backing failed due to the U.S. Civil War.

Career
 

Richardson returned to the U.S. in 1865, settling in New York that October. He found work with a builder, Charles, whom he had met in Paris. The two worked well together but Richardson was not being challenged. He had little to do and yearned for more. With no work Richardson fell into a state of poverty looking for more work.  One of his first commissions was the William Dorsheimer House on Delaware Ave in Buffalo, NY, which is in the style of the Second Empire with a Mansard roof.  This important commission led to many other commissions.  The style that Richardson developed over time, however, was not the more classical style of the École, but a more medieval-inspired style, influenced by William Morris, John Ruskin and others. Richardson developed a unique and highly personal idiom, adapting in particular the Romanesque of southern France. His early works, however, were not very remarkable. "There are few hints in the mediocre work of Richardson's early years of what was to come in his maturity, when, beginning with his competition-winning design ... for the Brattle Square Church in Boston, he adopted the Romanesque."

In 1869, he designed the Buffalo State Asylum for the Insane (now known as the Richardson Olmsted Complex) in Buffalo, the largest commission of his career and the first appearance of Richardsonian Romanesque style. A massive Medina sandstone complex, it is a National Historic Landmark and, as of 2009, was being restored.

Trinity Church in Boston, designed by Richardson and built 1872–1877, solidified his national reputation and led to major commissions for the rest of his life. Although incorporating historical elements from a variety of sources, including early Syrian Christian, Byzantine, and both French and Spanish Romanesque, it was more "Richardsonian" than Romanesque. Trinity was also a collaboration with the construction and engineering firm of the Norcross Brothers, with whom the architect would work on some 30 projects.

He designed the Ames Monument, which was constructed from 1880 to 1882, and is located at the highest point of the original Transcontinental Railway (the financing of which was spearheaded by Oliver, Jr. and his brother Oakes Ames), east of Laramie, Wyoming.  The Ames brothers and family provided generous patronage for Richardson's works, and after Oliver's death, Richardson was commissioned to design the Ames Free Library established in 1883 by a bequeath in Ames's will.

He was well-recognized by his peers; of ten buildings named by American architects as the best in 1885, fully half were his: besides Trinity Church, there were Albany City Hall, Sever Hall at Harvard University, the New York State Capitol in Albany (as a collaboration), and Oakes Ames Memorial Hall in North Easton, Massachusetts.

Despite the success of Trinity, Richardson built only two more churches, focusing instead on the monumental buildings he preferred, plus libraries, railroad stations, commercial buildings, and houses. Of his buildings, the two he liked best, the Allegheny County Courthouse (Pittsburgh, 1884–1888) and the Marshall Field Wholesale Store (Chicago, 1885–1887, demolished 1930), were completed posthumously by his assistants.

Later years
Richardson spent much of his later years in his house at 25 Cottage St. in Brookline, Massachusetts, which had a studio attached.

Richardson died in 1886 at age 47 of Bright's disease. On his last day, he signed an informal will directing the three assistants still remaining to carry on the business, which was soon formalized as Shepley, Rutan and Coolidge. One example includes Richardson's design for the Greater Cincinnati Chamber of Commerce Building. Richardson had won the selection process in 1885 and nearly finalized the work, but after his death his successors completed the project.

He was buried in Walnut Hills Cemetery, Brookline, Massachusetts. Despite an enormous income for an architect of his day, his "reckless disregard for financial order" meant that he died deeply in debt, leaving little to his widow and six children.

Major work

Trinity Church
Richardson's most acclaimed early work is Trinity Church. The interior of the church is one of the leading examples of the arts and crafts aesthetic in the United States. It was at Trinity that Richardson first worked with Augustus Saint Gaudens, with whom he would work many times in the ensuing years. Across the square is the Boston Public Library, built later (1895) by Richardson's former draftsman, Charles Follen McKim. Together these and the surrounding buildings comprise one of the outstanding American urban complexes, built as the centerpiece of the newly developed Back Bay.

Richardson Olmsted Campus
The largest building complex of HH Richardson's career, Richardson Olmsted Complex in Buffalo, New York, United States was designated a National Historic Landmark in 1986. The first building to display his characteristic style the complex of buildings was designed in concert with the famed landscape team of Frederick Law Olmsted and Calvert Vaux in the late 1800s, incorporating a system of enlightened treatment for people with mental illness developed by Dr. Thomas Story Kirkbride. Over the years, as mental health treatment changed and resources were diverted, the buildings and grounds began a slow deterioration. In 2006, the Richardson Center Corporation was formed with a mandate to save the buildings and bring the Campus back to life through a state appropriation.

Today, the Richardson Olmsted Campus is being transformed into a cultural amenity for the city. Arriving in 2018, the Richardson Olmsted Campus will also have the Lipsey Architecture Center of Buffalo. The remaining buildings have been stabilized pending future opportunities.

Building types

Richardson pointedly claimed ability to create any type of structure a client wanted, insisting he could design anything "from a cathedral to a chicken coop." "The things I want most to design are a grain elevator and the interior of a great river-steamboat." However, architectural historian James F. O'Gorman sees Richardson's achievement particularly in four building types: public libraries, commuter train station buildings, commercial buildings, and single-family houses.

Public libraries
A series of small public libraries donated by patrons for the improvement of New England towns makes a small coherent corpus that defines Richardson's style: Winn Memorial Library (Woburn), Ames Free Library (Easton), the Converse Memorial Library (Malden), and the Thomas Crane Public Library (Quincy), (1880–1882) "generally regarded by architectural historians as the masterpiece of Richardson's libraries", the Hubbard Memorial Library (Ludlow, Massachusetts), and Billings Memorial Library on the campus of the University of Vermont. These buildings seem resolutely anti-modern, with the atmosphere of an Episcopalian vicarage, dimly lit for solemnity rather than reading on site. They are preserves of culture that did not especially embrace the contemporary flood of newcomers to New England. Yet they offer clearly defined spaces, easy and natural circulation, and they are visually memorable. Richardson's libraries found many imitators in the "Richardsonian Romanesque" movement.

The Thomas Crane Public Library is regarded as the best of Richardson's libraries. In his earlier libraries, Richardson's approach was to conceive the parts and then assemble them, while in the later ones such as Crane he thought in terms of the whole. Richardson also engaged in a process of simplification and elimination with each successive library, until in Crane "Richardson's concentration on the relation of solid to void, of wall to window, becomes the basis for a harmonious abstraction with scarcely a reference to any past style."

Railroad buildings

Richardson also designed nine railroad station buildings for the Boston & Albany Railroad as well as three stations for other lines. More subtle than his churches, municipal buildings and libraries, they were an original response to this relatively new building type. Beginning with his first at Auburndale (1881, demolished 1960s), Richardson drew inspiration for these station buildings from Japanese architecture that he learned about from Edward S. Morse, a Harvard zoologist who began traveling to Japan in 1877, originally for biological specimens. Falling in love with Japan, upon his return that same year Morse began giving illustrated "magic lantern" public lectures on Japanese ceramics, temples, vernacular architecture, and culture. Richardson incorporated Japanese concepts "in both sihouette and spatial concept", including the karahafu ("excellent gable", but generally poorly translated as "Chinese gable" despite its Japanese origin), the eyelid dormer, and the wide hip roof with extended eaves, all shown by Morse.

Among the few stations still extant, these influences are perhaps best illustrated in his Old Colony station (Easton, Massachusetts, 1881–1884). Here he uses the Syrian arch that became a hallmark of Richardson designs for both the porte-cochère and the windows of the main structure. Reminiscent of a courtyard and temple that Morse illustrated from Nikkō in Tochigi prefecture, Japan, the hip roof on wide, bracketed eaves nearly hides the rough stonework below in shadow. Richardson even included a carved dragon at each end of the beam spanning the arches of windows. The walls "become horizontal planes hovering above one another with bands of windows in between."

Richardson was an early although not the first U.S. architect to look to Japan, but his train stations "form the earliest sustained application of Japanese inspiration in American architecture, an undeniable precursor to Frank Lloyd Wright's Prairie house designs". As with his libraries, Richardson evolved and simplified as the series continued, and his famous Chestnut Hill station (Newton, Massachusetts, 1883–1884, demolished circa 1960) featured clean lines with less Japanese influence.

After his death, more than 20 other stations were designed in Richardson's style for the Boston and Albany line by the firm of Shepley, Rutan and Coolidge, all draftsmen of Richardson at the time of his death. Many Boston and Albany stations were landscaped by Richardson's frequent collaborator, Frederick Law Olmsted. Additionally, a railroad station in Orchard Park, New York (near Buffalo) was built in 1911 as a replica of Richardson's Auburndale station in Auburndale, Massachusetts. The original Auburndale station was torn down in the 1960s during construction of the Massachusetts Turnpike. The original Richardson stations on the Boston and Albany Highland branch have either been demolished or converted to new uses (such as restaurants). Two of the stations designed by Shepley, Rutan, and Coolidge (both in Newton, Massachusetts) are still used by Boston's MBTA (green line) public transit service: and Newton Highlands station and Newton Centre station.

Commercial buildings

The noted Marshall Field Wholesale Store (Chicago, 1885–1887, demolished 1930) is Richardson's "culminating statement of urban commercial form", and its remarkable design influenced Louis Sullivan, Frank Lloyd Wright, and many other architects. According to Jeffrey Karl Ochsner, who has compiled all of Richardson's architectural works, despite its demolition in 1930, the Marshall Field Wholesale Store "is probably the most famous of Richardson's buildings, one that Richardson himself saw as among his most significant." Architectural critic Henry-Russell Hitchcock states that in the Field Store, Richardson "was, perhaps, never more creative architecturally." Drawing from his own earlier work and both Romanesque and Renaissance precedents, Richardson designed this "massive but integrated" seven-story stone warehouse. Minimizing ornamentation in an era that employed much of it, he stressed what he termed "the beauty of material and symmetry rather than mere superficial ornamentation" with "the effects depending on the relations of 'voids and solids'... on the proportion of the parts." Not requiring the new steel frame technology because of its comparatively low height, Richardson used multi-storied windows topped by arches to tie the stories together, and the regular patterns of the windows to tie the entire building into "a simple and unified solid occupying an entire block."

Single-family houses
Richardson designed many important single-family residences, but his famous John J. Glessner House (Chicago, 1885–87) is his best and most influential urban house. The Mary Fisk Stoughton House (Cambridge, Massachusetts, 1882–1883), the Henry Potter House (St. Louis, 1886–1887, demolished 1958), and the Robert Treat Paine Estate (aka Stonehurst) (Waltham, Massachusetts, 1886) play that role for suburban and country settings. The Glessner House in particular influenced Frank Lloyd Wright as he began developing what would become his Prairie School houses. With his house for Reverend Percy Browne (Marion, Massachusetts, 1881–82) Richardson revived "the old colonial form (of the gambrel roof) to shape the facade of an artistically ambitious house. Perhaps he used the gambrel to signify the humility appropriate to the profession of his client, but in doing so he sanctioned its use for wealthier patrons and by other architects. Within three years the crumpled gambrel profile was showing up everywhere" and became one of the notable features of Shingle Style architecture.

Richardsonian Romanesque

Richardson is one of few architects to be immortalized by having a style named after him. "Richardsonian Romanesque", unlike Victorian revival styles like Neo-Gothic, was a highly personal synthesis of the Beaux-Arts predilection for clear and legible plans, with the heavy massing that was favored by the pro-medievalists. It featured picturesque roofline profiles, rustication and polychromy, semi-circular arches supported on clusters of squat columns, and round arches over clusters of windows on massive walls.

Following his death, the Richardsonian style was perpetuated by a variety of proteges and other architects, many for civic buildings like city halls, county buildings, court houses, train stations and libraries, as well as churches and residences. These include:
 the successor firm of Shepley, Rutan and Coolidge, who completed some two dozen unfinished projects and then continued to produce work in the same style, and continued to employ his collaborators the Norcross Brothers for construction and engineering expertise, Frederick Law Olmsted for landscape architecture, and the English sculptor John Evans for stonecarving
 Stanford White and Charles Follen McKim, who worked in Richardson's office as young men, went on to form McKim, Mead and White and moved into the radically different Beaux-Arts architecture style
 Richardson's great admirer Louis Sullivan adapted Richardson's characteristic lessons of texture, massing, and the expressive language of stone walling (see Richardson's noted Chicago building Marshall Field's Wholesale Store), particularly at Chicago's Auditorium Building, and these influences are detectable in the work of Sullivan's own student Frank Lloyd Wright.
 Richardson found sympathetic reception among young Scandinavian architects of the following generation, notably Eliel Saarinen

 The Patrick F. Taylor Library, formerly known as the Howard Memorial Library, was built soon after Richardson's death. It is sometimes called "the only Richardson building located in the South". Residents of New Orleans had wanted an example of Richardson's work, a native son of New Orleans. The office of Shepley, Rutan and Coolidge used a Richardson design which had been submitted and rejected some years earlier for a library in Saginaw, Michigan. This leads some, particularly those in New Orleans, to argue that the building can be said to be by Richardson; the counter argument is that the design was not originally intended for this location and the building was constructed after Richardson's death with no input from the architect beyond the initial design.  The library building is currently part of the Ogden Museum of Southern Art.
 The Amelia S. Givin Library in Mount Holly Springs, PA was designed by James T. Steen, a well known Pittsburgh architect who worked extensively in the Richardsonian Romanesque style.  The Givin Library was built in 1889 in the Richardsonian style.  Its interior was finished in an Orientalism theme which used the 1885 patented Moorish Fretwork screens of Moses Younglove Ransom. The Givin Library is still in use as a public library.

Replicas
Although many structures exist in the Romanesque style and some borrow so heavily that they are often mistaken for Richardson designs, several buildings have been built specifically to mimic a single Richardson structure.
 Wellesley Farms Railroad Station – This structure was built by Shepley, Rutan and Coolidge (draftsmen of Richardson) soon after Richardson's death.  Although this firm built many stations in Richardson's style, they were specifically penalized for this one because it was so similar to Richardson's Eliot station in Newton, Massachusetts. Eliot station was torn down in the 1950s.
 A railroad station in Orchard Park, New York (near Buffalo), was built in 1911 as a replica of Richardson's Auburndale station in Auburndale, Massachusetts. The original Auburndale station, Richardson's first for the Boston & Albany Railroad and which was described by Henry Russell Hitchcock as "the best he ever built", was torn down in the 1960s during construction of the Massachusetts Turnpike.
 The Old Orange County Courthouse in Santa Ana, California, was completed in 1906 and is heavily influenced by Richardson's designs, bearing a strong resemblance to Richardson's Sever Hall at Harvard.
 Castle Hill Light is a lighthouse in Newport, Rhode Island, which is often attributed to Richardson.  Richardson drew a sketch for the lighthouse at that location which may have been the basis for the design, though the actual structure does not include the residence featured in Richardson's sketch.

Chronological list of works

This is a partial list of works by Richardson:
 1867 Church of the Unity – Springfield, Massachusetts
 1867 Western Railroad Offices – Springfield, Massachusetts  
 1867 Grace Episcopal Church – Medford, Massachusetts
 1868 Benjamin W. Crowninshield House – Boston, Massachusetts
 1868 H. H. Richardson House – Clifton, Staten Island, New York
 1868 Alexander Dallas Bache Monument – Washington, DC
 1868 William Dorsheimer House – Buffalo, New York
 1869 Agawam National Bank – Springfield, Massachusetts 
 1869 Brattle Square Church (now First Baptist Church) – Boston, Massachusetts
 1869 New York State Asylum – Buffalo, New York
 1869 Worcester High School – Worcester, Massachusetts 
 1871 Hampden County Courthouse – Springfield, Massachusetts
 1871 North Congregational Church – Springfield, Massachusetts
 1872 Trinity Church – Boston, Massachusetts (National Historic Landmark)
 1872 Frank William Andrews House – Newport, Rhode Island
 1874 William Watts Sherman House – Newport, Rhode Island
 1875 Hayden Building – Boston, Massachusetts 
 1875 R. and F. Cheney Building – Hartford, Connecticut 
 1875 New York State Capitol – Albany, New York
 1876 Rev. Henry Eglinton Montgomery Memorial – New York City
 1876 Winn Memorial Library – Woburn, Massachusetts
 1877 Oliver Ames Free Library – North Easton, Massachusetts
 1878 Sever Hall – Cambridge, Massachusetts
 1879 Oakes Ames Memorial Hall – North Easton, Massachusetts
 1879 Rectory for Trinity Church – Boston, Massachusetts
 1879 Ames Monument – Sherman, Wyoming
 1880 F.L. Ames Gate Lodge – North Easton, Massachusetts
 1880 Bridge in the Fenway – Boston, Massachusetts
 1880 Stony Brook Gatehouse – Boston, Massachusetts
 1880 Thomas Crane Public Library – Quincy, Massachusetts (National Historic Landmark)
 1880 Dr. John Bryant House – Cohasset, Massachusetts
 1880 Albany City Hall – Albany, New York
 1881 Austin Hall – Cambridge, Massachusetts
 1881 Pruyn Monument – Albany, New York
 1881 Rev. Percy Browne House – Marion, Massachusetts
 1881 North Easton station - Old Colony Railroad Station – North Easton, Massachusetts
 1882 Grange Sard Jr. House – Albany, New York
 1882 Mary Fiske Stoughton House – Cambridge, Massachusetts
 1883 Billings Memorial Library – Burlington, Vermont
 1883 Connecticut River Railroad Station – Holyoke, Massachusetts
 1883 Allegheny County Courthouse and Allegheny County Jail – Pittsburgh, Pennsylvania
 1883 Robert Treat Paine Estate – Waltham, Massachusetts
 1883 Boston & Albany Railroad Station – Framingham, Massachusetts
 1884 Boston & Albany Railroad Station – Newton, Massachusetts
 1884 F.L. Ames Gardener's Cottage – North Easton, Massachusetts
 1884 Immanuel Baptist Church – Newton, Massachusetts
 1884 Ephraim W. Gurney House – Beverly, Massachusetts
 1884 Union Station – Palmer, Massachusetts
 1885 Converse Memorial Library/Building – Malden, Massachusetts (National Historic Landmark)
 1885 Benjamin H. Warder House – Washington, DC
 1885 Bagley Memorial Fountain – Detroit, Michigan
 1885 John J. Glessner House – Chicago, Illinois (National Historic Landmark)
 1885 Boston & Albany Railroad Station – Wellesley Hills, Massachusetts
 1885 Union Passenger Station – New London, Connecticut
 1885 Emmanuel Episcopal Church – Pittsburgh, Pennsylvania 
 1886 Lululaund or the Sir Hubert von Herkomer House – Bushey, Hertfordshire, England
 1886 Dr. H.J. Bigelow House – Newton, Massachusetts
 1886 Isaac H. Lionberger House – St. Louis, Missouri

Gallery

Notes

 Breisch, Kenneth A,. Henry Hobson Richardson and the Small Public Library in America: A Study in Typology, MIT Press, 1997
 Floyd, Margaret Henderson, Henry Hobson Richardson:  A Genius for Architecture, Monacelli Press, NY 1997
 Hitchcock, Henry Russell, The Architecture of H. H. Richardson and His Times, Museum of Modern Art, NY 1936; 2nd ed., Archon Books, Hamden CT 1961;  rev. paperback ed., MIT Press, Cambridge MA and London 1966
 Larson, Paul C., ed., with Susan Brown, The Spirit of H.H. Richardson on the Midland Prairies: Regional Transformations of an Architectural Style, University Art Museum, University of Minnesota, Minneapolis, and Iowa State University Press, Ames  1988
 Meister, Maureen, ed., H. H. Richardson:  The Architect, His Peers, and Their Era, MIT Press, Cambridge MA 1999
 Ochsner, Jeffrey Karl, H.H. Richardson: Complete Architectural Works, MIT Press, Cambridge MA  1984
 Ochsner, Jeffrey Karl, and Andersen, Dennis A., Distant Corner:  Seattle Architects and the Legacy of H. H. Richardson, University of Washington Press, Seattle 2003
 O'Gorman, James F., Living Architecture:  A Biography of H. H. Richardson, Simon & Schuster, NY 1997
 O'Gorman, James F., H. H. Richardson:  Architectural Forms for an American Society, University of Chicago Press, Chicago 1987
 O'Gorman, James F., H. H. Richardson and His Office:  Selected Drawings, David R. Godine, Boston 1974
 Roth, Leland M., A Concise History of American Architecture, Harper & Row publishers, NY, NY  1979
 Shand-Tucci, Douglas, Built in Boston: City and Suburb, 1800 - 1950, University of Massachusetts Press, Amherst, MA  1988
 Van Rensselaer, Mariana Griswold, Henry Hobson Richardson and His Works, Dover Publications, Inc. NY  1959 (Reprint of 1888 edition)
 Van Trump, James D., "The Romanesque Revival in Pittsburgh," Journal of the Society of Architectural Historians, Vol. 16, No. 3 (October 1957), pp. 22–29
 Wright, Mark, "H. H. Richardson's House for Reverend Browne, Rediscovered," Journal of the Society of Architectural Historians, Vol. 68, No. 1 (March 2009), pp. 74–99 https://www.sah.org/docs/default-source/preservation-advocacy/2019-percy-browne-house-jsah-article.pdf

External links

 
 Richardson's present day successor firm, Shepley Bulfinch Richardson and Abbott
 
 
 The 53 extent Richardson sites and his Brookline, MA house

 
.
Architects from Louisiana
Architects from Massachusetts
1838 births
1886 deaths
American alumni of the École des Beaux-Arts
Harvard College alumni
Deaths from nephritis
People from Brookline, Massachusetts
Historicist architects
American railway architects
19th-century American architects
Fellows of the American Institute of Architects